Death Below is the upcoming tenth studio album by American metalcore band August Burns Red. It will be released on March 24, 2023, through SharpTone Records. The album was produced by Carson Slovak and Grant McFarland. It is the band's first studio release with the label.

Background and promotion
On March 25, 2022, August Burns Red announced that they had parted ways with Fearless Records and signed with SharpTone Records while also revealed that they are working on the studio album with a teaser newly shared online. On November 1, the band unexpectedly announced the album itself and release date. At the same time, they also revealed the album cover and the track list.

On November 3, the band released the first single "Ancestry" featuring Jesse Leach of Killswitch Engage and its corresponding music video. On January 25, 2023, the band unveiled the second single "Backfire" along with a music video. On February 22, one month before the album release, the band published the third single "Reckoning" featuring Spencer Chamberlain of Underoath along with an accompanying music video.

Track listing
Adapted from Apple Music.

Personnel
August Burns Red
 Jake Luhrs – lead vocals
 JB Brubaker – lead guitar
 Brent Rambler – rhythm guitar
 Dustin Davidson – bass, backing vocals
 Matt Greiner – drums, piano

Additional musicians
 Jesse Leach – guest vocals on track 3
 Jason Richardson – guest guitar solo on track 4
 J.T. Cavey of Erra – guest vocals on track 11
 Spencer Chamberlain – guest vocals on track 12

Additional personnel
 Carson Slovak – production
 Grant McFarland – production

References

2023 albums
August Burns Red albums
SharpTone Records albums
Upcoming albums